Sumit Kumar (born 12 December 1995) is an Indian cricketer. He made his List A debut on 4 October 2019, for Haryana in the 2019–20 Vijay Hazare Trophy. He made his first-class debut on 9 December 2019, for Haryana in the 2019–20 Ranji Trophy.

References

External links
 

1995 births
Living people
Indian cricketers
Haryana cricketers
Place of birth missing (living people)